Snow Lake is a small reservoir with an adjacent camping area in west central New Mexico.

Geography 
It is in a mountain forest habitat, with Ponderosa pines.

References 

Reservoirs in New Mexico